Violetta Ignatyeva (born 16 January 2002) is a Russian athlete who specializes in the discus throw, she however competes as part of the authorized neutral athletes. She was the gold medallist at the World Athletics U20 Championships in 2021.

References

External links 
Violetta Ignatyeva at World Athletics

Living people
2002 births
Russian female discus throwers
World Athletics U20 Championships winners
Athletes (track and field) at the 2018 Summer Youth Olympics
21st-century Russian women